The Norfolk State–Old Dominion rivalry (known by the Scope Series in basketball) refers to games between the Norfolk State Spartans of MEAC and the Old Dominion Monarchs of the Sun Belt Conference. The two schools are the only NCAA Division I schools in Norfolk, Virginia. 

The rivalry has been described as an "intense but friendly cross-town rivalry".

History 
Both universities have their origins in the 1930s. Old Dominion University formed as the Norfolk branch of the College of William & Mary in 1930, while Norfolk State University formed as the Norfolk branch of Virginia Union University in 1935.

In 1942, Norfolk State became independent of VSU, while Old Dominion became independent of William & Mary in 1962. The first known meeting between the two schools in any varsity sport came in 1965, when the two men's basketball programs met. The game was held at the Rockwell Hall Gymnasium and won by Old Dominion, 86–82. The two programs regularly met from the late 1960s until early 1980s. In the late 1960s and early 1970s, the series was dominated by Norfolk State, and in the late 1970s through 1980s the rivalry was dominated by Old Dominion. During this period, both schools played at the NCAA Division II level, with much success. In 1975, Old Dominion won the NCAA Division II men's basketball tournament. Since 1981 though, the men's basketball programs have met only four times, most recently at the neutral-site Norfolk Scope in 2017, which has called local media to see the series become an annual affair at the Scope. Head coach, Jeff Jones, of ODU has said he sees no plans to broaden the "Scope Series". Much of this attributes to the Spartan's traditionally weak conference and low RPI, and playing at a neutral venue, and the politics that is associated with that.

Although the men's basketball series has been more dormant, the two baseball programs have regularly played each other on a home-and-home series since the mid 1990s. The series has largely favored Old Dominion who hold a 31-8 advantage over Norfolk State. The two football programs have met regularly in the 2010s once Old Dominion reestablished their football program.

All-time series results

Football 
Norfolk State and Old Dominion played for the first time on November 26, 2011 in the first round of the FCS playoffs which resulted in a 35–18 Spartan loss. Old Dominion and NSU announced a new deal for a home and away series in 2013 and 2015 to help fill out open game dates for ODU's transition to the FBS. ODU plays at Foreman Field; NSU at Dick Price Stadium.

Basketball

Men's basketball

Baseball 
Old Dominion baseball plays their home games at the Bud Metheny Baseball Complex, where they have played since 1983. Norfolk State baseball plays their home games at Marty L. Miller Field, where they have played since 1997. Prior to the opening of both venues, Old Dominion played at Foreman Field, and Norfolk State alternated between Harbor Park and Met Park.

Source

References

External links 
 Norfolk State Spartans
 Old Dominion Monarchs

College baseball rivalries in the United States
College basketball rivalries in the United States
College football rivalries in the United States
College sports rivalries in the United States
College sports in Virginia
Norfolk State Spartans
Old Dominion Monarchs
Sports in Norfolk, Virginia
Sports rivalries in Virginia
1965 establishments in Virginia